LTR or ltr may refer to:

Science and technology
 Learning to rank, an algorithm used in the construction of ranking models for information retrieval systems
 Litre (or liter), a metric unit of volume
 Load task register, a computing instruction
 Logic Trunked Radio, a computer-controlled radio system
 Long terminal repeat, a DNA sequence found in retroviruses and retrotransposons

Other uses
 Left to right, a group of writing systems
 Letter (paper size)
 Model 700P Light Tactical Rifle, a rifle manufactured by Remington Arms
 London Turkish Radio
 Long-term relationship

See also
 "Left to Right", a short story by Isaac Asimov
 Left-to-right mark, a typesetting control character.